Larry Cassidy (born 1970) is an accomplished thoroughbred racing jockey who is notable for winning over 40 Group 1 races as well as three consecutive Sydney jockey premierships in 1998, 1999 and 2000.

Cassidy's brother Jimmy Cassidy, who is seven years older than Larry, was an established jockey in New Zealand and then Australia who won the Melbourne Cup on Kiwi in 1983. Another brother, Ricky, was also a jockey. 

Cassidy also started his career in New Zealand, leaving his home aged 12 to do an apprenticeship with Brent Beattie at Palmerston North, and later Bruce Marsh at Woodville. After moving to Australia to ride and establishing himself as a senior jockey, Cassidy embarked on stints in Hong Kong, Macau and Singapore. Returning to Australia, Cassidy moved to Brisbane and predominantly rides at Queensland racecourses such as Doomben, Eagle Farm and the Sunshine Coast.

Notable wins
Some of Cassidy's major wins were:

 1989 Telegraph Handicap on Festal dead heating with Mr Tiz and Lance O'Sullivan at Trentham Racecourse
 1989 New Zealand 2000 Guineas on Finnegan Fox
 1992 Telegraph Handicap on Morar
 1995 Australian Derby on Ivory's Irish, trained by Bart Cummings
 1997 Doncaster Handicap on Secret Savings, trained by Gai Waterhouse
 1997 Sydney Cup on Linesman, trained by Gai Waterhouse
 1998 Flight Stakes on Sunline
 1998 VRC Derby on Arena, trained by John Hawkes
 1999 New Zealand Oaks on Let's Sgor
 1999 Warwick Stakes on Sunline
 1999 Doncaster Handicap on Sunline
 2000 Brisbane Cup on Yippyio, trained by A Denham
 2002 Singapore Derby on Smart Bet
 2003 Singapore Derby on Lead To Victory
 2005 Brisbane Cup on Portland Singa, trained by N Mcburney

Cassidy's resume also includes a win on the champion, Winx, in the Sunshine Coast Guineas on 16 May 2015. This was to be the first win of a 33-race unbeaten sequence for Winx, although the horse was ridden by Hugh Bowman and James McDonald (once) from then on.

References 

1970 births
Living people
New Zealand jockeys
Australian jockeys
Sportspeople from Wellington City